ABC Gippsland (call sign: 3GLR) is an ABC Local Radio station in Gippsland, Victoria. The station is based in Sale and covers from Warragul, through to Mallacoota. Mim Hook hosts the Breakfast program, Jonathon Kendall presents a Statewide Mornings program from the Sale studio and Melissa Fistric presents Saturday Breakfast. 

Journalists at the station include Bec Symons, Natasha Schapova, Madeleine Spencer and Rachael Lucas.

At the time of its opening on 31 October 1935 ABC Gippsland 3GI was the sixth regional station opened by the ABC and the first of its kind in regional Victoria. The station was initially based in Sale's Post Office Building, and boasted what was at the time the tallest mast and most powerful transmitter in the state, located near Longford and currently transmits on 828kHz. ABC Gippsland now broadcasts from York Street, Sale.

The station was also formerly known as GI FM.

Sister station 3MT based at Omeo broadcasts on a frequency of 720kHz.

See also
 List of radio stations in Australia

References

Gippsland
Radio stations in Victoria
Gippsland (region)